The following is a list of species of Prasophyllum recognised by the Plants of the World Online and a few additional species recognised by the Australian Plant Census. The common names in the list below are generally those used by David Jones. Australian authorities recognise some of the names below as synonyms.*

Prasophyllum abblittiorum P.A.Collier (Tas.)
Prasophyllum affine Lindl.1840 – Jervis Bay leek orchid, heathland leek orchid (N.S.W)
Prasophyllum albovirens D.L.Jones & L.M.Copel. (N.S.W.)
Prasophyllum album R.S.Rogers (S.A.)
Prasophyllum alpestre D.L.Jones – mauve leek orchid (N.S.W., Vic., Tas.)
Prasophyllum alpinum R.Br. – alpine leek orchid (Tas.)
Prasophyllum amoenum D.L.Jones – dainty leek orchid, Snug leek orchid (Tas.)
Prasophyllum anticum D.L.Jones & D.T.Rouse – Pretty Hill leek orchid (Vic.)
Prasophyllum apoxychilum D.L.Jones – tapered leek orchid (Tas.)
Prasophyllum asinantum R.J.Bates (S.A.)
Prasophyllum atratum D.L.Jones – Three Hummock leek orchid (Tas.)
Prasophyllum australe R.Br. – southern leek orchid, austral leek orchid (Qld., N.S.W., Vic., Tas., S.A.)
Prasophyllum bagoense D.L.Jones – Bago leek orchid (N.S.W.)
Prasophyllum barnettii D.L.Jones & D.T.Rouse – Anglesea leek orchid (Vic.)
Prasophyllum basalticum D.L.Jones & L.M.Copel. (N.S.W.)
Prasophyllum beatrix D.L.Jones & D.T.Rouse – Marung leek orchid (N.S.W., Vic.)
Prasophyllum brevilabre (Lindl.) Hook.f. – short-lip leek orchid (Qld., N.S.W., Vic., Tas.)
Prasophyllum brevisepalum D.L.Jones & L.M.Copel. (N.S.W.)
Prasophyllum brownii Rchb.f. – Christmas leek orchid (W.A.)
Prasophyllum calcicola R.J.Bates – limestone leek orchid (W.A., S.A.)
Prasophyllum campestre R.J.Bates & D.L.Jones – sandplain leek orchid, inland leek orchid (N.S.W., Qld.)
Prasophyllum canaliculatum D.L.Jones – channelled leek orchid, summer leek orchid (N.S.W.)
Prasophyllum candidum R.J.Bates & D.L.Jones – Kiandra leek orchid (N.S.W., Vic.)
Prasophyllum caricetum D.L.Jones – Cathcart leek orchid (N.S.W.)
Prasophyllum castaneum D.L.Jones – chestnut leek orchid (Tas.)
Prasophyllum catenemum D.L.Jones (S.A.)
Prasophyllum caudiculum D.L.Jones – Guyra leek orchid (N.S.W.)
Prasophyllum colemaniarum R.S.Rogers (Vic., extinct)
Prasophyllum colensoi Hook.f. N.Z.
Prasophyllum collinum D.L.Jones (S.A.)
Prasophyllum concinnum Nicholls – trim leek orchid (Tas.)
Prasophyllum constrictum R.S.Rogers (1909) – tawny leek orchid (S.A., Tas., Vic.)
Prasophyllum copelandii D.L.Jones (N.S.W.)
Prasophyllum correctum D.L.Jones – gaping leek orchid, Bairnsdale leek orchid (Vic.)
Prasophyllum crassum D.L.Jones & R.J.Bates (S.A.)
Prasophyllum crebriflorum D.L.Jones – crowded leek orchid (Tas.)
Prasophyllum cucullatum Rchb.f. – hooded leek orchid (W.A.)
Prasophyllum cuneatum D.L.Jones & G.Brockman (W.A.)
Prasophyllum cyphochilum Benth. – pouched leek orchid (W.A.)
Prasophyllum diversiflorum Nicholls – Gorae leek orchid (Vic.)
Prasophyllum dossenum R.J.Bates & D.L.Jones (N.S.W.) 
Prasophyllum drummondii Rchb.f. – swamp leek orchid (W.A.)
Prasophyllum elatum R.Br. – tall leek orchid, snake orchid, piano orchid (all Australian states)
Prasophyllum erythrocommum D.l.Jones & D.T.Rouse – tan leek orchid (Vic.)
Prasophyllum exile D.L.Jones & R.J.Bates (Qld., N.S.W.)
Prasophyllum favonium D.L.Jones – western leek orchid (Tas.)
Prasophyllum fecundum R.J.Bates – self-pollinating leek orchid (S.A.)
Prasophyllum fimbria Rchb.f. – fringed leek orchid (W.A.)
Prasophyllum fitzgeraldii R.S.Rogers & Maiden – Fitzgerald's leek orchid (S.A.)
Prasophyllum flavum R.Br. – yellow leek orchid (N.S.W., Qld., Vic., Tas.)
Prasophyllum fosteri D.L.Jones – Shelford leek orchid (Vic.)
Prasophyllum frenchii F.Muell. – maroon leek orchid,swamp leek orchid (Vic., S.A.)
Prasophyllum fuscum R.Br. – slaty leek orchid, tawny leek orchid (N.S.W.)
Prasophyllum gibbosum R.Br. – humped leek orchid (W.A.)
Prasophyllum giganteum Lindl. – bronze leek orchid (W.A.)
Prasophyllum gilgai D.L.Jones & D.T. Rouse – gilgai leek orchid (Vic.)
Prasophyllum goldsackii J.Z.Weber & R.J.Bates – Goldsack's leek orchid (S.A.)
Prasophyllum gracile Lindl. – little laughing leek orchid (W.A.)
Prasophyllum gracillimum Nicholls – slender leek orchid (W.A.)
Prasophyllum graniticola D.L.Jones & L.M.Copel. (N.S.W.)
Prasophyllum gravesii R.J.Bates (S.A.)
Prasophyllum hectori (Buchanan) Molloy, D.L.Jones & M.A.Clem – swamp leek orchid (N.Z.)
Prasophyllum helophilum D.L.Jones & D.T.Rouse (N.S.W.)
Prasophyllum hians Rchb.f. – yawning leek orchid (W.A.)
Prasophyllum holzingeri D.L.Jones & L.M.Copel. (N.S.W.)
Prasophyllum hygrophilum D.L.Jones & D.T.Rouse – swamp leek orchid (Vic.)
Prasophyllum incompositum D.L.Jones (Qld.)
Prasophyllum incorrectum D.L.Jones – golfer's leek orchid (Tas.)
Prasophyllum incurvum D.L.Jones (Tas.)
Prasophyllum innubum D.L.Jones – Brandy Mary's leek orchid (N.S.W.)
Prasophyllum jeaneganiae D.L.Jones (N.S.W., A.C.T.)
Prasophyllum keltonii D.L.Jones – Kelton's leek orchid (N.S.W.)
Prasophyllum lanceolatum* R.S.Rogers = Prasophyllum triangulare – dark leek orchid (W.A.)
Prasophyllum laxum R.J.Bates – lax leek orchid (S.A.)
Prasophyllum limnetes D.L.Jones – marsh leek orchid (Tas.)
Prasophyllum lindleyanum Rchb.f. – green leek orchid (N.S.W., Vic., Tas.)
Prasophyllum litorale R.J.Bates – coastal leek orchid (S.A., Vic.)
Prasophyllum maccannii D.L.Jones & D.T.Rouse – inland leek orchid (Vic.)
Prasophyllum macrostachyum R.Br. – laughing leek orchid (W.A.)
Prasophyllum macrotys Lindl. – inland leek orchid (W.A.)
Prasophyllum milfordense D.L.Jones (Tas.)
Prasophyllum mimulum D.L.Jones – highland leek orchid (Tas.)
Prasophyllum mollissimum* Rupp = Genoplesium woollsii (F.Muell.) D.L.Jones & M.A.Clem. – dark midge orchid (N.S.W.)
Prasophyllum montanum R.J.Bates & D.L.Jones – mountain leek orchid (N.S.W., A.C.T., Vic.)
Prasophyllum morganii Nicholls – Cobungra leek orchid (Vic.)
Prasophyllum mucronatum* Rupp = Genoplesium rufum (R.Br.) D.L.Jones & M.A.Clem. – rufous midge orchid (N.S.W.)
Prasophyllum murfetii D.L.Jones – Fleurieu leek orchid (S.A.)
Prasophyllum nichollsianum* Rupp = Genoplesium nudiscapum (Hook.f.) D.L.Jones & M.A.Clem. – bare midge orchid (Tas.)
Prasophyllum niphopedium D.L.Jones – marsh leek orchid (Vic.)
Prasophyllum nitidum D.L.Jones & R.J.Bates – shining leek orchid (Vic., S.A.)
Prasophyllum nublingii* R.S.Rogers  = Genoplesium filiforme (Fitzg.) D.L.Jones & M.A.Clem. – glandular midge orchid (Qld., N.S.W.)
Prasophyllum obovatum* Rupp = Genoplesium rufum (R.Br.) D.L.Jones & M.A.Clem. – rufous midge orchid (N.S.W.)
Prasophyllum occidentale R.S.Rogers – plains leek orchid (S.A., Vic.)
Prasophyllum occultans R.J.Bates – hidden leek orchid (S.A.)
Prasophyllum odoratissimum D.L.Jones – scented leek orchid, fragrant leek orchid (W.A.)
Prasophyllum odoratum R.S.Rogers – fragrant leek orchid, Rogers scented leek orchid, sweet leek orchid (N.S.W., Vic.)
Prasophyllum olidum D.L.Jones – pungent leek orchid (Tas.)
Prasophyllum ovale Lindl. – little leek orchid (W.A.)
Prasophyllum pallens D.L.Jones – musty leek orchid (N.S.W.)
Prasophyllum pallidum Nicholls – pale leek orchid (S.A.)
Prasophyllum parviflorum (R.S.Rogers) Nicholls – slender leek orchid (Vic.)
Prasophyllum parvifolium Lindl. – autumn leek orchid (W.A.)
Prasophyllum patens R.Br. – sandstone leek orchid, broad-lipped leek orchid (N.S.W.)
Prasophyllum paulinae D.L.Jones & M.A.Clem. – Pauline's leek orchid (W.A.)
Prasophyllum perangustum D.L.Jones – Knocklofty leek orchid (Tas.)
Prasophyllum petilum D.L.Jones & R.J.Bates – Tarengo leek orchid (N.S.W., A.C.T.)
Prasophyllum pictum D.L.Jones & L.M.Copel. (N.S.W.)
Prasophyllum pilligaense D.L.Jones & L.M.Copel. (N.S.W.)
Prasophyllum plumiforme Fitzg. – dainty leek orchid (W.A.)
Prasophyllum praecox D.L.Jones – early leek orchid (S.A.)
Prasophyllum pruinosum R.S.Rogers – plum leek orchid (S.A.)
Prasophyllum pulchellum D.L.Jones – pretty leek orchid (Tas.)
Prasophyllum pyriforme E.Coleman – graceful leek orchid (Vic., N.S.W.)
Prasophyllum readii D.L.Jones & D.T.Rouse – Streatham leek orchid (Vic.)
Prasophyllum reflexum* Fitzg. = Genoplesium woollsii (F.Muell.) D.L.Jones & M.A.Clem. – dark midge orchid (N.S.W.)
Prasophyllum regium R.S.Rogers – king leek orchid (W.A.)
Prasophyllum retroflexum D.L.Jones (N.S.W., Vic.) - congested leek orchid
Prasophyllum ringens (Rchb.F.) R.J.Bates (W.A., S.A.)
Prasophyllum robustum (Nicholls) M.A.Clem. & D.L.Jones – robust leek orchid (Tas.)
Prasophyllum rogersii Rupp – Barrington Tops leek orchid (N.S.W.)
Prasophyllum roseum D.L.Jones & R.J.Bates – pink lip leek orchid (Vic., S.A.)
Prasophyllum rostratum Lindl.  – slaty leek orchid (Tas.)
Prasophyllum rousei D.L.Jones & R.J.Bates (Vic.)
Prasophyllum sandrae D.L.Jones (N.S.W.)
Prasophyllum sargentii (Nicholls) A.S.George – frilled leek orchid (W.A.)
Prasophyllum secutum D.L.Jones – northern leek orchid (Tas.)
Prasophyllum solstitium D.L.Jones (N.S.W.)
Prasophyllum spadiceum D.L.Jones & R.J.Bates - brown lip leek orchid (S.A., Vic.)
Prasophyllum sphacelatum D.L.Jones – subalpine leek orchid (N.S.W., Vic., Tas.)
Prasophyllum spicatum R.J.Bates & D.L.Jones – dense leek orchid (S.A., Vic.)
Prasophyllum stellatum D.L.Jones – Ben Lomond leek orchid (Tas.)
Prasophyllum striatum R.Br. – streaked leek orchid (N.S.W.)
Prasophyllum stygium D.L.Jones & D.T.Rouse – elfin leek orchid (Vic.)
Prasophyllum suaveolens D.L.Jones & R.J.Bates – fragrant leek orchid (Vic.)
Prasophyllum subbisectum Nicholls – Pomonal leek orchid (Vic.)
Prasophyllum suttonii R.S.Rogers & B.Rees – Mount Buffalo leek orchid, mauve leek orchid (N.S.W., Vic.)
Prasophyllum sylvestre R.J.Bates & D.L.Jones – forest leek orchid (Vic., N.S.W.)
Prasophyllum sylvicola D.L.Jones (Vic.)
Prasophyllum tadgellianum R.S.Rogers – Tadgell's leek orchid, alpine leek orchid (N.S.W., A.C.T., Vic., Tas.)
Prasophyllum taphanyx D.L.Jones - graveside leek orchid (Tas.)
Prasophyllum tortilis D.L.Jones & R.J.Bates (S.A.)
Prasophyllum transversum* Fitzg. = Genoplesium nudum (Hook.f.) D.L.Jones & M.A.Clem. – tiny midge orchid, red midge orchid (N.S.W., Vic., Tas., N.Z.)
Prasophyllum triangulare Fitzg. – dark leek orchid (W.A.)
Prasophyllum trifidum* Rupp = Genoplesium rufum (R.Br.) D.L.Jones & M.A.Clem. – rufous midge orchid (N.S.W.)
Prasophyllum truncatum Lindl. – truncate leek orchid (Tas.)
Prasophyllum tunbridgense D.L.Jones – Tunbridge leek orchid (Tas.)
Prasophyllum unicum* Rupp = Genoplesium rufum (R.Br.) D.L.Jones & M.A.Clem. – red midge orchid (N.S.W.)
Prasophyllum uvidulum D.L.Jones & D.T.Rouse – summer leek orchid (Vic.)
Prasophyllum validum R.S.Rogers – Mount Remarkable leek orchid (S.A.)
Prasophyllum venustum D.L.Jones & D.T.Rouse (N.S.W.)
Prasophyllum viretrum D.L.Jones & D.T.Rouse (Vic.)
Prasophyllum viriosum D.L.Jones & D.T.Rouse (N.S.W.)
Prasophyllum wallum R.J.Bates & D.L.Jones – wallum leek orchid (Qld.)
Prasophyllum wilkinsoniorum D.L.Jones (N.S.W.)

References

Prasophyllum